Nikolai Vladimirovich Yefimov (31 May 1910 in Orenburg – 14 August 1982 in Moscow) was a Soviet mathematician. He is most famous for his work on generalized Hilbert's problem on surfaces of negative curvature.

Yefimov grew up in Rostov-on-Don and graduated from Rostov State University, where he studied with Morduhai-Boltovskoi. He worked at Voronezh State University from 1934 to 1941. He taught at the Moscow State University since 1946. Aleksei Pogorelov was one of his students there.

He received the Lobachevsky Prize in 1951 and Lenin Prize in 1966. He was an invited plenary speaker at the International Congress of Mathematicians in Moscow, 1966. He became a corresponding member of the Academy of Sciences of the Soviet Union in 1979.

References 
 A. D. Aleksandrov, S. P. Novikov, A. V. Pogorelov, È. G. Poznyak, P. K. Rashevskiǐ, È. R. Rozendorn, I. Kh. Sabitov, S. B. Stechkin, "Obituary: Nikolai Vladimirovich Yefimov" (in Russian), Uspekhi Mat. Nauk 38:5 (1983), 111–117.

External links
 
 A Brief Course in Analytic Geometry, downloadable from Internet Archive

1910 births
1982 deaths
20th-century Russian mathematicians
People from Orenburg
Corresponding Members of the USSR Academy of Sciences
Academic staff of Moscow State University
Southern Federal University alumni
Lenin Prize winners
Recipients of the Order of the Red Banner of Labour
Differential geometers
Russian educators
Russian mathematicians
Soviet educators
Soviet mathematicians